The A50 autoroute is a French motorway connecting Marseille to Toulon. The motorway is 65 km and has a mixture of 2x2 and 2x3 lanes that run through mountainous coastal terrain along the Mediterranean. As such, it has some relatively sharp turns and steep gradients by French motorway standards, and some sections have a reduced speed limit of 110 km/h.

The first section between Marseille and Aubagne was opened in 1962 and was until 1963 part of the A52 autoroute until it was renumbered after the surrounding motorways were constructed. Most of the remainder between Aubagne and Toulon was completed by 1975. The road is tolled between Roquefort-la-Bédoule and Sanary-sur-Mer and is managed by ESCOTA and was the first section to trial Télépéage or Télébadge, an automatic toll payment system using a windscreen mounted sensor, in 1992.

At the eastern end of the A50, drivers can choose between entering Toulon by the RN 8 or crossing under the city by going through the tunnel de Toulon, which leads directly to the A57 autoroute and on to Hyeres and Nice. The southern carriageway of the tunnel finally  opened in 2014, after some 20 years of planning and construction, making the tunnel a 2x2 lane two-way link between the A50 and A57. Until then, the tunnel had only a two-lane carriageway running east to west, which opened in 2002.

Junctions

Exchange A50-A55 Junction with A55 autoroute in Marseille.     
 Péage     
01 (Prado) Towns served: Marseille.        
02 (Place de Pologne/Menpenti-La Capelette) Towns served: Marseille. 
Exchange A50-A507 Junction with A507 spur to A7 
03 (La Pomme) Towns served: Marseille.             
Service Area: La Pomme     
04 (La Valentine) Towns served: Saint-Marcel  
05 (La Penne) Towns served: La-Penne-sur-Huveaune     
Exchange A50-A501 Junction with A501 spur to A52
00 (Aubagne Sud-A502) Towns served: Junction with A502 spur to D8n and Aubagne     
00 Exchange A52-A50 Junction with  A52 to Aix.    
06 (Carnoux) Towns served: Carnoux-en-Provence      
07 (La Bédoule-nord/sud) Towns served: Roquefort-la-Bédoule     
Rest Area: Pas d'Ouillier    
08 (Cassis) Towns served: Cassis     
Péage de La Ciotat
09 (La Ciotat) Towns served: La Ciotat     
Service Area: Le Liouquet/Les Plaines Baronnes     
10 (Les Lecques) Towns served: Les Lecques     
11 (La Cadière-d'Azur) Towns served: Le Beausset     
Péage de Bandol
12 (Bandol) Towns served: Bandol     
Rest Area: Sanary    
13 (Ollioules) Towns served: Ollioules     
14 (Châteauvallon) Towns served: La Seyne-sur-Mer     
15 (Toulon-Ouest/La Seyne-Centre/Arsenal) Towns served: Port and town of Toulon, La Seyne-sur-Mer     
16 (Bon Rencontre) Towns served: Beauclaire, Toulon     
Autoroute becomes the N8 into Toulon and to the A57 to Nice.

References

External links 
 A50 Motorway in Saratlas

A50